Faradina binti Mohd. Nadzir (born 7 February 1985), also known as Dina Nadzir or Dina, is a Malaysian singer, radio announcer, actress, television presenter, and businesswoman. She was the runner up for the first season of Malaysian Idol. After discovering her singing voice at the age of 16, she appeared on the series approximately three years later in 2004. She is the two-time winner of the "Annual World Championships of Performing Arts" competition in Los Angeles.

Filmography

Film

Television

Theatre

Discography

Studio album
 Cinta Datang Lagi (2005)

Singles
 "Cinta Datang Lagi" (2005)
 "Malu Tapi Mahu" (2007)
 "Inspirasi Hidupku" (2009)
 "Laju Lampau (OST Rempit vs Impak Maksima)" (2009)
 "Indahnya (OST Pisau Cukur)" (2009)
 "Walt Disney's Hercules (Malay Version)" (2010)
 "Walt Disney's Mulan (Malay Version)" (2010)
 "Sejauh Ini" (2011)
 "Selamat Tinggal" – Zizan Razak & Dina (2011)
 "Kasih (OST Bini-Biniku Gangster)" (2011)
 "Senjakala (OST Senjakala)" (2011)
 "Wanita Besi" (2011)
 "Getting Away With Murder" – Pop Shuvit (feat. Dina Nadzir) (2011)
 "Aci Aci Buka Pintu" – Pop Shuvit (feat. Dina Nadzir) (2011)
 "Aku Ingin (OST Aku Terima Nikahnya)" (2012)
 "Dendam Pencinta" (2012)
 "Eratkan Jalinan (for Astro Raya Campaign)" (2012)
 "Planet Gempak (for Karnival Planet Gempak)" (2013)
 "Demi Kasih" (2013)
 "Hargai Cinta (OST Aku Pilih Kamu)" – Dina Nadzir (feat. Zwen Addeen) (2013)
 "Kaca dan Permata" – Akim & Dina Nadzir (2014)
 "Tarbiah Cinta (OST Tarbiah Cinta)" (2014)
 "Kosong Kosong (for Astro's Raya Campaign)" (2014)
 "Malaysia Kau Ku Cinta" (2014) – Adibah Noor (feat. Dina Nadzir)
 "Percaya" – Hazama, Dina Nadzir & Astro Radio All Stars (2014)
 "Mengapa Dia" (2014)
 "We Don't Talk Anymore (Malay Version)" – Charlie Puth (feat. Dina Nadzir) (2016)
 "Antara Sahabat Dan Cinta (OST Semusim Rindu)" (2017)

Jingles
 "TV3 Sing Off Tune" (2009)
 "Ribena Strawberry Advertisement" (2010)
 "Malaysia Year of Festivals 2015 (for Tourism Malaysia)" (2015)

Awards and achievements

Others
 Face of Estée Lauder's Earth Month Campaign (2012)

References

External links
 Dina at Malaysian Idol

1985 births
Living people
Malaysian people of Malay descent
21st-century Malaysian women singers
Malaysian radio announcers
Malaysian television personalities
Malay-language singers
Malaysian Idol participants